Kunerth's algorithm is an algorithm to determine the modular square root of a number.
The algorithm does not require the factorization of the modulus, and only has one modular operation that is often easy if the cipher is a prime.

To find 

do the following steps

1) find the modular square root of  This step is quite easy, no matter how big the original modulus is, if  is a prime.

Most of Kunerth's examples in his original paper solve this equation by having C be a natural square and thus setting z to zero. 
Expand out the following equation to obtain the quadratic
if  then
 
You can always ensure that the quadratic can be solved by adjusting the N term(modulus) in the above equation.  Thus

will ensure a quadratic of 
You can then adjust F to ensure that C+F is a square. Quite large modula, such as  can have their square roots taken quickly via this method. 
The parameters of the polynomial expansion are quite fluid, in that  can be done, for instance.  It is quite easy to set X and Y so that  is a square.  The modular square root of  can be taken this way.

3) Having solved the associated quadratic equation we now have the variables w and set v=r (if C in the quadratic is a natural square).  

4) Solve for two more variables, alpha and beta by the following equation

alpha == w (v + w beta )

Please note that this is not a modular operation and that alpha and beta could have many paired answers.

5) Obtain a value for X via a factorization of the following polynomial.

obtaining an answer like
(-37 + 9 x) (1 + 25 x)

6) Obtain the modular square root by the equation. Remember to set X so that the term above is zero.  Thus X would be 37/9 or -1/25.

The hard step is the solving of the quadratic equation, but if this can be done then the algorithm quickly finds the modular square root without much computation.

Example 
To obtain  first obtain 

Then expand out the following polynomial

which is

Since, in this case the C term in the quadratic is a natural square then 

Solve for alpha and beta in the following equation involving W and V   

alpha == W (V + W* beta)

 getting the answer alpha=15 and beta = -2. (There may be many paired answers to this equation)

Then factor the following polynomial

obtaining

Then obtain the modular square root via 

Verify that 

In the case that  has no answer then  can be used instead.

See also 
 Methods of computing square roots
 Adolf Kunerth, "Sitzungsberichte. Academie Der Wissenschaften" vol 75 ,II, 1877, pp. 7-58
 Adolf Kunerth, "Sitzungsberichte. Academie Der Wissenschaften" vol 82, II, 1880, pp. 342-375

References 

Mathematics articles needing expert attention
Algorithms
Cryptographic algorithms